Pastis & Buenri is a Spanish production duo and DJs, composed of David Álvarez Tudela and David Pàmies Sabatés. The group plays mákina music, which was popular in Spain throughout the mid-1990s.

Musical career
The group was formed in the early 1990s in Barcelona, Spain. In 1996, the duo became the main attraction of the now famous nightclub Xque. In the early 2000, the group appeared live among DJ Skudero and Xavi Metralla, in a mini disco named Música Sí on the TV channel Spanish TVE1. In 2003, the group released a compilation album titled DJ Makina Vol. 3 in France, distributed by Wagram Music.

Singles

References

Spanish DJs
Musical groups established in 1995
Spanish electronic musicians
Spanish dance music groups
Spanish musical groups
Spanish Eurodance groups
Electronic dance music DJs